James Forten School (1822–?), originally known as Mary Steet School then Lombard Street Colored School and later Bird School or Mr. Bird's School, was the first public school for African Americans in Philadelphia, Pennsylvania.

History
It opened on Mary Steet in 1823 after being organized and approved in 1822. It had one teacher for 199 students. Attendance was irregular and it had only one teacher. Philadelphia's "colored" schools had only white teachers up until the Civil War era.

In 1828 it was moved to the Lombard Street school building and white students who had been there were relocated to a new school. James M. Bird served as principal and the school became known as Bird School or Bird's School. James Forten and the Pennsylvania Abolition Society helped keep it open after enrollment dropped upon Brid's transfer elsewhere in the school system. He was brought back.

By 1854 Maria C. Hutton was serving as principal of the girls school.

The school was eventually renamed for prominent African American businessman, abolitionist, and civil rights activist James Forten. It was located at Sixth Street and Lombard Street. Attendance declined after Bird's departure and the school struggled.

In 1869 it was rebuilt and in 1897 the school was renovated and reopened as the James Forten Elementary Manual Training School. Manual training was taught at the school which saw increasing enrollment by immigrants. Many of the immigrants were Russian Jews.

Alumni
Alumni include James Mara Adger and Joseph E Lee.

See also
Institute for Colored Youth, a public high school for African Americans in Philadelphia
Roberts Vaux Junior High School

References

Schools in Philadelphia
African-American history in Philadelphia